Tommy Atkins is a 1915 British silent war film directed by Bert Haldane and starring Blanche Forsythe, Jack Tessier and Roy Travers. It is based on an 1895 play of the same title by Ben Landeck and Arthur Shirley.

Plot
A German-born captain kills his wife and frames his fiancée, who loves a curate.

Cast
 Blanche Forsythe as Ruth Raymond  
 Jack Tessier as The Curate 
 Roy Travers as Captain Richard Maitland 
 Maud Yates as Rose Selwyn 
 Barbara Rutland

References

Bibliography
 Goble, Alan. The Complete Index to Literary Sources in Film. Walter de Gruyter, 1999.

External links

1915 films
1915 war films
British silent feature films
British war films
Films directed by Bert Haldane
British black-and-white films
1910s English-language films
1910s British films